Jo Seo-hoo is a South Korean actress. She is known for her roles in dramas such as Manhole, My Sweet Dear, Brilliant Heritage and Blind. She also appeared in movies such as Race to Freedom: Um Bok Dong, My Sweet Dear, B Cut and Air Murder.

Filmography

Television series

Web series

Film

References

External links 
 

1994 births
Living people
21st-century South Korean actresses
South Korean television actresses
South Korean film actresses